Skipwith railway station served the village of Skipwith, North Yorkshire, England from 1912 to 1968 on the Derwent Valley Light Railway.

History 
The station opened on 21 July 1912 by the Derwent Valley Light Railway.
It closed to passengers on 1 September 1926 and to freight in 1968.

References

External links 

Disused railway stations in North Yorkshire
Railway stations in Great Britain opened in 1912
Railway stations in Great Britain closed in 1926
1912 establishments in England
1968 disestablishments in England